Steven James "Steve" Lampier (born 2 March 1984) is a British former road racing cyclist, who currently manages UCI Continental team .

Biography
From Helston, Cornwall, Lampier is based in Falmouth, Cornwall. In December 2014  announced that Lampier would join them for the 2015 season.

Major results

2005
 2nd Time trial, National Under-23 Road Championships
2010
 1st Stage 3 Tour of Doonhame
 7th Grand Prix Of Al Fatah
 9th East Midlands International CiCLE Classic
2011
 1st  Sprints classification Tour Series
 1st Wally Gimber Trophy
 4th Woking Tour Series
 5th Glade Spring Road Race
 6th Overall Tour of Doonhame
 6th East Yorkshire Classic Premier Calendar
2012
 1st John Hinksman Memorial
 8th Overall Tour Doon Hame
2013
 2nd Grand Prix of Wales
2014
 1st Coalville Wheelers Road Race
 7th Beaumont Trophy
2015
 1st  Overall British Cycling Elite Road Series
4th Stafford Kermesse
4th Ryedale Grand Prix
 1st British Cycling Spring Cup
2nd Chorley Grand Prix
2nd Overall Tour of the Reservoir
 1st Overall Totnes-Vire Stage Race
1st Stage 3
 2nd Wally Gimber Trophy
 4th Sheffrec CC Spring Road Race
2016
 4th Chorley Grand Prix
 5th Overall New Zealand Cycle Classic
2017
 6th Overall New Zealand Cycle Classic
 7th Overall Tour de Normandie 
7th Beaumont Trophy 
2018
4th Gravel and Tar 
2019
 1st  Points classification Tour Series
 9th Rutland–Melton International CiCLE Classic

References

External links

 
 

1984 births
Living people
Sportspeople from Truro
English male cyclists
English track cyclists
People from Helston